Oodnadatta is a small, remote outback town and locality in the Australian state of South Australia, located  north-north-west of the state capital of Adelaide by road or  direct, at an altitude of . The unsealed Oodnadatta Track, an outback road popular with tourists, runs through the town.

Town facilities include a hotel, caravan park, post office, general stores, police station, hospital, fuel and minor mechanical repairs. The old railway station now serves as a museum. From the 1880s to the 1930s, Oodnadatta was a base for camel drivers and their animals, which provided cartage when the railway was under construction and along outback tracks before roads were established.

After the railway line was lifted, Oodnadatta's role changed from that of a government service centre and supply depot for surrounding pastoral properties to a residential freehold town for Aboriginal families who, moving from cattle work, bought empty houses as their railway employee occupants left.

Origin of name
The name was said to be derived from the Arrernte word utnadata, meaning "yellow blossom of the mulga". However, mulga trees do not grow anywhere near the town. An alternative explanation is that it derived from coodnadatta or kudnadatta, meaning "dead man's poo": the first two syllables encompass "rotten" or "excreta" and the second two refer to "there".

History 

For tens of thousands of years, Aboriginal tribes visited the place where Oodnadatta is located as a reliable source of water on their trade route; there was no settlement at Oodnadatta itself. John McDouall Stuart explored the region in 1859. His route was generally followed by the surveyors of the Overland Telegraph Line, completed in 1872. Alfred Giles referred to a place called the Yellow Waterhole, or Angle Pole, later known as Hookey's Waterhole and The Peake, near Oodnadatta. The course chosen for the Central Australian Railway likewise followed the route because a water supply was  essential for steam locomotives.

Telegraphs, camels and railways
Angle Pole is the point near Oodnadatta where the direction of the telegraph line changed to a more northerly direction. It is near the Peake cattle station, also known as "The Peake", or Freeling Springs. The ruins of Peake telegraph station exist on the station today. Alfred Giles refers to his only meeting with the explorer Ernest Giles (no relation) at "the Peake" in the 1870s.

By the 1880s the telegraph route was being used by camel trains, many led by "Afghan" cameleers (actually from many different places in the Indian subcontinent), or "Ghans", as they became known, who were brought to Australia for the task of hauling goods into Central Australia for pioneer settlers. Many of the cameleers settled in Oodnadatta and Marree, some with families and some marrying, mainly Aboriginal women.

In the 1880s, Angle Pole was identified as the proposed terminus for the extension of the Great Northern Railway. When the railway was built, a town was established here, and in October 1890 was proclaimed a government township and renamed Oodnadatta.

In 1889, Angle Pole was also proposed as the south-eastern terminus of a land grant railway from Roebuck Bay in Western Australia. This railway was proposed by a London syndicate and would have been about 1000 miles (1600 km) long, with the wider  gauge. However this was never built.

The town remained the terminus of the Great Northern until the line was extended to Alice Springs in 1929. The line became known as the Central Australia Railway and the train service on the line was known as the Ghan in honour of the Afghan cameleers. The railway was built with narrow gauge tracks, and train traffic was frequently disrupted by washouts and other damage to the trackbed, leading to a slow and unreliable service.  The railway through Oodnadatta was closed and a new standard gauge line was built to the west, bypassing Oodnadatta, and opening in October 1980.

World War II
Oodnadatta's busiest era was World War II when the Australian Army and the Royal Australian Air Force set up local facilities to service troop trains and aircraft en route to Darwin.

21st century
Tourist traffic along the Oodnadatta Track and the mining industry keep the village alive. The Aboriginal school is the biggest employer.

In 2018, the federal government announced a major upgrade to the Track, to better serve both the tourists and truck drivers on this major freight and cattle transport route.

Access, facilities, attractions 

Oodnadatta can be reached by an unsealed road from Coober Pedy or via the unsealed Oodnadatta Track from Marree to Marla or from the north via Finke/Aputula, NT (on the "Old Ghan Heritage Trail").

The Pink Roadhouse (so-called because it is painted bright pink) provides petrol, a general store, meals, a variety of accommodation, and post office facilities. The Transcontinental Hotel, built in the 1890s, is on the same side of the road, as is the caravan park.

Oodnadatta is serviced twice weekly by the Coober Pedy Oodnadatta One Day Mail Run. The OKA mail truck also carries some general freight and passengers.

The  air strip adjacent to the town, originally built during World War II, has a sealed surface.

Historic buildings
The historic Oodnadatta railway station, now a museum, is listed on the South Australian Heritage Register.

Demographics
At the 2016 census, the population of Oodnadatta was 204 with Aboriginal and/or Torres Strait Islander people making up 53.3% of the population. This was a decrease on 2006, when the population was 277, of whom less than half were Indigenous.

In 2016, 61.7% of people spoke only English at home. Other languages spoken included Yankunytjatjara 4.7%, Luritja 3.6%, Afrikaans 1.6%, Tagalog 1.6% and Pitjantjatjara 1.6%.

Oodnadatta Aboriginal School
The Oodnadatta Aboriginal School, located in Kutaya Terrace, is a school operated by the Government of South Australia offering education from Reception to Year 12.  In 2018, the school had a total enrolment of 14 students, of whom 86% were indigenous, and a teaching staff of three.

Climate 
Oodnadatta has a hot desert climate (Köppen climate classification BWh) and has also recorded the highest reliably measured maximum temperature in Australia: 50.7 °C (123.3 F) on 2 January 1960. This record stood unequalled until 13 January 2022, when a temperature of 50.7 °C (123.3 F) was measured in Onslow, Western Australia, thus equalling Oodnadatta's record.

A higher temperature was recorded at Cloncurry in 1889; however, this has since been shown to have been recorded in a non-standard enclosure and likely to have been considerably cooler than first believed. There is a large sign in Oodnadatta claiming the town is "The driest town, the driest state of the driest Continent".

Governance
Oodnadatta is located within the federal Division of Grey, the state electoral district of Stuart, the Pastoral Unincorporated Area of South Australia and the state’s Far North region. In the absence of a local government authority, the community in Oodnadatta receives municipal services from a state government agency, the Outback Communities Authority.

Oodnadatta on Mars
The name Oodnadatta has been used as a name for a crater on the planet Mars.

See also
 List of extreme temperatures in Australia

References

Notes

Citations

Further reading
Oodnadatta (on Flinders Ranges Research)
 Oodnadatta (Aussie Towns)
 Tracking History to Oodnadatta by Roderick Eime
 Oodnadatta Pioneer Cemetery with photos of headstones

External links

Towns in South Australia
Aboriginal communities in South Australia
Far North (South Australia)
Places in the unincorporated areas of South Australia